Katherine J. Clarke is a British ancient historian, specialising in Greek historiography and geography. She is Professor in Ancient History in the Faculty of Classics, University of Oxford, and a Fellow of St Hilda's College, Oxford.

Career
Clarke studied literae humaniores at St John's College, Oxford, and then completed a doctorate on the ancient geographer Strabo at Christ Church, Oxford in 1996. She was appointed tutorial fellow of ancient history at St Hilda's College in 1998. She was Vice-Principal of St Hilda's College from 2013 to 2016 and Chair of the Sub-faculty of Ancient History and Classical Archaeology within the Faculty of Classics from 2015 to 2017.

Clarke's first book, Between Geography and history (1999) discussed how the presentation of geography in Polybius, Posidonius, and Strabo responded to the rise of Roman power. In the book, she argues that geography and geographic ideas were more important and complex in ancient historiography than hitherto realised. W. J. Tatum and R. Alston characterised it as "essential reading" for work on Posidonius, Strabo, and Hellenistic geography.

Clarke's second book, Making Time for the Past (2008) explores how ancient Greek city-states conceived of time and the past, as a central part of their communal identities. The book was a groundbreaking work for the study of local history in ancient Greece.

A third book, Shaping the Geography of Empire (2018) deals with the representation of geography and the physical world in Herodotus' Histories.

Selected publications
 Between Geography and History: Hellenistic Constructions of the Roman World (Oxford University Press, 1999; paperback edition 2001)
 Making Time for the Past: Local History and the Polis (Oxford University Press, 2008; paperback edition 2011)
 Shaping the Geography of Empire: Man and Nature in Herodotus' Histories (Oxford University Press, 2018)

References

External links
 Faculty Page
 College page

Living people
Fellows of St Hilda's College, Oxford
English classical scholars
Women classical scholars
Year of birth missing (living people)